Timo Kautonen (born 12 March 1945) is a Finnish footballer. He played in 42 matches for the Finland national football team from 1964 to 1976. He played for over 20 seasons in Lahti based clubs, mostly for Reipas Lahti.

References

External links
 

1945 births
Living people
Finnish footballers
Finland international footballers
Association football defenders
Sportspeople from Lahti